Bander Nasser Al-Mutairi (born 14 March 1990) is a Saudi professional footballer who plays as a left back for Pro League club Al-Fayha .

International
He made his debut for the Saudi Arabia national football team on 25 March 2019 in a friendly against Equatorial Guinea, as a 37th-minute substitute for Abdullah Al-Shamekh.

External links

References

1990 births
Living people
Saudi Arabian footballers
Saudi Arabia international footballers
Association football defenders
Al Batin FC players
Al-Fayha FC players
Saudi First Division League players
Saudi Professional League players
Saudi Second Division players